Nabbed may refer to:

 Nabbed or arrested, the act of apprehending and taking a person into custody 
 Nabbed (TV series), a New Zealand reality television show